replicr, 2019 is the sixth studio album by 65daysofstatic, which was released on September 27, 2019.

Track listing

Charts

References 

2019 albums
65daysofstatic albums
Superball Music albums